Ramekon O'Arwisters (born August 15, 1960) is an African-American artist, best known for his fabric and social-art practice, Crochet Jam. He creates art using the folk-art tradition of rag-rug weaving. Ramekon's work has been exhibited in New York, North Carolina, Tokyo, Bologna, Miami Beach, and San Francisco. He is also the former curator of fine-art photography at SFO Museum.

Early life and education
Ramekon was born in Kernersville, North Carolina. He grew up on a farm. His parents worked in a cotton factory in Winston-Salem, North Carolina. He finished college at the University of North Carolina in 1982 with a B.A. in psychology and political science. In 1986, he earned a Master of Divinity (M.Div.) degree from Duke University School of Divinity in Durham, North Carolina. Ramekon now resides in San Francisco.

Career
Ramekon's work is informed by a cherished childhood memory that is steeped in the African-American tradition of weaving and quilting. Ramekon explores the context of resistance and conformity, between control and freedom by weaving free-form, organic fabric sculptures. He is the recipient of the 2014 Eureka Fellowship Award administered by the Fleishhacker Foundation and the Artadia Award in 2003.

Press

References

Living people
African-American artists
Artists from San Francisco
1960 births
People from Kernersville, North Carolina
21st-century African-American people
20th-century African-American people
Quilters
Artists from North Carolina